The udon kiri (うどん切), soba kiri (そば切 or 蕎麦切り包丁), and kashi kiri are a group of specialized knives used in the Japanese kitchen to make udon and soba noodles respectively. The udon kiri is also sometimes called menkiri bocho (麺切り包丁), and is distinguished from the Soba and Kashi kiri knives by a blade that drops in to cover less than half of the length of the handle rather that reaching the end of the handle like the soba. The soba kiri is characterized by a long blade that spans down the full length of the handle whereas the blade of the Kashi kiri only curves to meet the top of the handle. To make soba or udon the dough is flattened and folded, and then cut with the menkiri bocho to produce long rectangular noodles. For this purpose the menkiri bocho has a straight and long cutting edge to cut the noodles straight to the board. The knife is usually heavy to aid in the cutting of the noodles, usually with a slight forward motion. 

See also Japanese kitchen knives and the list of Japanese cooking utensils.

References

UDON-KIRI at mizunotanrenjo.jp

Japanese kitchen knives
Udon